National Highway 216A (also known as NH 216A) is a National Highway in the Indian state of Andhra Pradesh. It starts from Rajamahendravaram and passes through Ravulapalem, Tanuku, Tadepalligudem and terminates at Eluru.

Flyovers are being constructed by NHAI at Diwancheruvu, Lalacheruvu, Morampudi, Vemagiri, Kadiyapulanka, Jonnada Junctions in Rajamahendravaram city. Flyover at Undrajavaram Junction in Tanuku town is also in proposal to ease traffic.

 NH-216A is a spur road of National Highway 16.

Route length 
It

Junctions  

Terminal with NH16 at Gondugolanu (Bhimadole)near Eluru.

Terminal with NH16 at Rajamahendravaram.

See also 
 List of National Highways in India by highway number
 List of National Highways in India by state

References

External links 
 NH 216A on OpenStreetMap

National highways in India
National Highways in Andhra Pradesh